Mirbelia dilatata, commonly known as holly-leaved mirbelia, is a species of flowering plant in the family Fabaceae and is endemic to the south-west of Western Australia. It is an erect, bushy, shrub with prickly leaves and pink, purple or violet flowers.

Description
The leaves are leathery, the base tapered, sometimes to a short petiole. The petals are pink, bluish-purple or violet, the standard petal twice as long as the sepals and the wings shorter than the standard.

Taxonomy
Mirbelia dilatata was first formally described in 1811 by Robert Brown in Hortus Kewensis. The specific epithet (dilatata) means "widened", referring to the leaves widening upwards.

Distribution and habitat
Holly-leaved mirbelia grows in gravelly and sandy soils or laterite in a range of habitats, including forest, woodland and kwongan. It is found in the Avon Wheatbelt, Esperance Plains, Jarrah Forest, Mallee, Swan Coastal Plain and Warren bioregions of south-western Western Australia.

Conservation status
This species of pea is listed as "not threatened" by the Government of Western Australia Department of Biodiversity, Conservation and Attractions.

References

External links 
 Mirbelia dilatata occurrence data from the Australasian Virtual Herbarium

Flora of Western Australia
Plants described in 1811
dilatata
Taxa named by Robert Brown (botanist, born 1773)